The Army Command is the Royal Danish Army's top authority, and directly under the Defence Command. Originally created as the Army Staff, as part of the Danish Defence Agreement 2013–17, which called for major restructuring within the Danish military. It is the successor to Army Operational Command. On 1 January 2019, as part of the Danish Defence Agreement 2018–23, the name was changed to Army Command.

Army Command structure 2020

  Army Command, in Karup
  Multinational Division North, in Ādaži (Latvia)
  1st Brigade, in Holstebro
  2nd Brigade, in Slagelse
  Danish Artillery Regiment, in Oksbøl
  Engineer Regiment, in Skive
  Signal Regiment, in Fredericia
  Train Regiment, in Aalborg
  Intelligence Regiment, in Varde
  Royal Life Guards, in Høvelte
  Guard Hussar Regiment, in Slagelse
  Jutland Dragoon Regiment, in Holstebro
  Schleswig Foot Regiment, in Haderslev

References 

Military of Denmark
Denmark
Military units and formations established in 2014
Army commands (military formations)